King Thrushbeard is a 1984 Czechoslovakian film based on an adaptation of the Grimm Brothers fairy-tale Red Beard.

Plot
A fairy-tale about a beautiful but very haughty princess Anna who cruelly mocks each of her suitors. Finally, she is forced by the king to marry a beggar. The poor life, hard work, and love teach the princess a lesson and turn her into a loving and kind person.

Cast
Adriana Tarábková
Lukáš Vaculík
Zita Furková
Maria Schell
Gerhard Olschewski
Marián Labuda
Bronislav Poloczek
Peter Šimun
Vlado Černý
František Kovár
Peter Bzdúch
Ľudovít Kroner
Michal Gučík
Tucker Boone

References

External links
 

1984 films
1984 fantasy films
Czechoslovak fantasy films
German fantasy films
1980s German films